This is a list of electoral results for the district of King in South Australian state elections.

Members for King

Election results

Elections in the 2020s

Elections in the 2010s

References

South Australian state electoral results by district